The Snowshoe is a breed of cat originating in the United States of America in the 1960s. Snowshoes were first produced in Philadelphia when a Siamese breeder's cat gave birth to three kittens with white feet. The breeder, Dorothy Hinds-Daugherty, then began a breeding program to produce what were originally called "Silver Laces", crossing the strangely marked Siamese cats with bi-color American Shorthair cats and other breeds. When Hinds-Daugherty left the program, Vikki Olander began working with the cats and recruited new breeders, as well as worked towards full recognition within cat associations. Despite having existed for 45 years, Snowshoes are rare due to the difficulty of reproducing the correct coat markings. The marks are based on recessive genes for color points and on the co-dominant but variably-expressed piebald pattern gene, making it difficult to predict the appearance of offspring.

The coat coloration recognized by registries and associations is point coloration, and it comes in a variety of colors, though some organizations do not recognize certain colors. Snowshoe cats have an affectionate and docile disposition. Due to this, they do not do well under circumstances where they are left alone for long periods of time. Snowshoes are also very vocal, though their voices are not as loud as their Siamese ancestors. They are noted as being very intelligent and have the ability to learn tricks and open doors. These cats also enjoy water, and may swim.

History

In the 1960s, a cat owned by Siamese cat breeder Dorothy Hinds-Daugherty produced a litter of Siamese kittens in Philadelphia, Pennsylvania. Three of the kittens had unique markings, consisting of white points and feet. Intrigued by their looks, she began working to breed cats like them, using seal point Siamese with bicolor American Shorthairs. The offspring of those cats lacked the Siamese points, but by breeding the offspring to Siamese cats, the desired look was accomplished. Hinds-Daugherty named the breed "Snowshoe" because of their white feet. Hinds-Daugherty promoted the Snowshoe at local cats shows, though they were not recognized at the time. Hinds-Daughtery eventually abandoned the Snowshoe breeding program, and it was taken up by Vikki Olander.

Olander wrote the first breed standard for the Snowshoe, and succeeded in obtaining the Cat Fanciers Federation (CFF) and the American Cat Association's (ACA) "experimental breed" status for the Snowshoe in 1974. However, by 1977, Olander was the last breeder of the Snowshoe in the United States. After struggling to keep the breed alive, Olander was contacted by Jim Hoffman and Georgia Kuhnell, who were interested in the breed. Other breeders joined Olander, Hoffman, and Kuhnell, and they obtained the champion status from the CFF in 1983. In 1989, Olander left the program, as her fiancé was allergic to cats. However, by then the Snowshoe had a strong following, and the breed attained champion status with the American Cat Fanciers Association in 1990 and was recognized by The International Cat Association in 1993. Currently, breeders work to attain acceptance with the Cat Fanciers Association, but struggle with the lack of cats and breeders needed for the association's requirements.

Snowshoes are also fully recognized by the Fédération Internationale Féline, and the Cat Fanciers Federation.

Popularity and breeding
The Snowshoe is a rare breed, partly due to the difficulty of breeding cats with markings and patterns that conform well to breed standards. The Snowshoe's pattern relies on recessive genes and other factors to produce desired results. One gene, which causes the "V" facial pattern is an example of incomplete dominance. If the offspring produced has two dominant genes for the marking, then the feature will be larger than a cat with one dominant gene. However, other factors may influence the feature, which makes it difficult to predict the outcome. Another issue is the white boots, which can be caused by a piebalding gene or a gloving gene. The genes are difficult to control, and many cats' boots extend too far up the leg, do not reach far enough up the leg, or the cat completely lacks white. As such, pet-quality Snowshoes usually have too much white, too little white, or white features are mismarked. The cats' body type further complicates breeding, as the breeder must achieve the correct head shape and ear set, while still maintaining the American Shorthair's body structure and the length of the Siamese.

Characteristics

Anatomy
The ear size ranges from medium to medium-large with slightly rounded tips. The head may be triangular, however can be an "applehead" shape with a traditional cat look. The short-haired coat consists of solid and white patterns. Points (ears, tail, face-mask and sometimes legs) are solid black-based colors. White patterns vary, typically falling along the face, chest, stomach, and paws. The body is an even coloration, subtle shading to point color on back, shoulders and hips; toning to a lighter shade near chest and stomach. Paw pads may be white, point color, flesh tone, or mottled. Their color will darken with age, even to the point of turning a chocolate brown shade. In purebreds, the eyes are always blue. The tail is medium-sized. Snowshoe cats come in blue, lilac, lynx, fawn, chocolate, and seal points. The Snowshoe is a medium-large cat and longer length wise than many cats, with many males reaching 14  lbs or more.

Coat
In registries and cat associations, the recognized Snowshoe coat color is point coloration, with a light body color and darker ears, face, legs, and tail. The American Cat Fanciers Association recognizes seal point coloration and blue point coloration while the Fédération Internationale Féline recognizes seal, blue, black, chocolate, red, cream, cinnamon, and fawn point coloration. Additionally, the FIF recognizes the colors in tortoiseshell, tabby, and tortoiseshell-tabby coat patterns. The International Cat Association recognizes all pointed colors. Snowshoe kittens are born white, and markings appear within 1 to 3 weeks. Each Snowshoe has a pattern unique to the individual cat.

The Snowshoe's coat should be of medium to short in length, and should be bright and smooth with no noticeable undercoat. It is considered a fault within cat associations if the Snowshoe has a plush or double coat. The Snowshoe's coat undergoes seasonal changes and does not require much grooming.

Personality
Snowshoes are generally affectionate, sweet-tempered, and mellow. They enjoy the company of humans and being given attention, and are compatible with children and other pets. Snowshoes are very social and docile, and show great devotion and love towards their owners. Consequently, the cats of this breed dislike being left alone for long periods of time and are able to cope with working hours better if they have another cat companion. Snowshoes may express themselves and their complaints vocally, though their meows are not as loud as the Siamese. It is not unusual for a snowshoe to look concerned, they generally have a worried or concerned expression on their face for the majority of the time. The cats are also noted as being intelligent; they can learn to open various types of doors, and can be taught tricks, especially fetch. Snowshoes also enjoy water, particularly running water, and may on occasion swim. Though very active, they are not restless or easily agitated, and they have a fondness for perching in high places.

Famous Snowshoe cats
The internet celebrity Grumpy Cat was a mixed-breed cat with possible Snowshoe traces.

Dusty the Klepto Kitty is a domestic Snowshoe cat burglar from San Mateo, California. He earned the nickname Klepto Kitty after bringing home more than 600 items from the gardens he prowled at night.

Max the Roomba Cat was famous for riding a Roomba vacuum cleaner by his owner in Houston, Texas.

References

External links

 TICA 

Cat breeds
Cat breeds originating in the United States
Pennsylvania culture